Krobia is a genus of cichlid fish native to freshwater habitats in South America, with three species found in the Guianas and a single in the Xingu River basin. They are typically found in small streams or creeks with little current and they feed on small invertebrates. They were formerly included in Aequidens.

Species
There are currently four recognized species in this genus:

 Krobia guianensis (Regan, 1905) (Krobia)
 Krobia itanyi (Puyo, 1943) (Dolphin cichlid)
 Krobia petitella Steele, Liverpool & López-Fernández, 2013
 Krobia xinguensis S. O. Kullander, 2012

References

Cichlid fish of South America
Freshwater fish genera
Cichlid genera
Taxa named by Sven O. Kullander
Taxa named by Han Nijssen
Cichlasomatini